Transversotrema carmenae is a species of parasitic platyhelminthe found in nemipterids on Lizard Island.

References

Further reading
Cribb, Thomas H., et al. "Biogeography of tropical Indo-West Pacific parasites: A cryptic species of Transversotrema and evidence for rarity of Transversotrematidae (Trematoda) in French Polynesia." Parasitology international 63.2 (2014): 285–294.

External links

Plagiorchiida
Parasitic helminths of fish
Animals described in 2012